Jean Cuthand Goodwill OC (1928 – August 25, 1997) was a Canadian Cree nurse who, in 1954, became Saskatchewan's first Aboriginal woman to finish a nursing program.

Biography
Goodwill grew up on the Little Pine First Nation in Saskatchewan; she was a member of the Cree First Nations and a daughter of Cree leader John Tootoosis, about whom she would later write a biography. She decided to train as a nurse after spending three years at the sanatorium in Prince Albert recovering from tuberculosis. Graduating from the program at Holy Family Hospital in 1954, she then worked in rural Saskatchewan, where she reached patients in an emergency via bush plane or dog team. She also worked in Bermuda. After returning to Canada she became increasingly interested in aboriginal affairs, helping to develop an aboriginal magazine called Tawow.

Goodwill helped establish the Aboriginal Nurses Association of Canada, and served as the organization's president during the period of 1983 to 1990. She was the first Aboriginal woman to serve as "special advisor" to the minister of National Health and Welfare in the Canadian federal government; she also worked with the Department of Indian Affairs and Northern Development.

Goodwill taught Indian Health Studies at Saskatchewan Indian Federated College of the University of Regina (now First Nations University of Canada). She also helped to create a Native Access to Nursing Program at the University of Saskatchewan. She was a board member of the Canadian Public Health Association and served as president of the Canadian Society for Circumpolar Health.

Married in 1965, Goodwill and her husband Ken Miller had two adopted girls. Goodwill died of cancer in Regina, Saskatchewan in 1997.

Selected works
John Tootoosis: A Biography of a Cree Leader (1982)

Awards
Jean Goodwill Award, Manitoba Indian Nurses Association (1981)
Honorary Doctorate of Law, Queen's University (1986)
Officer of the Order of Canada (1992)
National Excellence Award, National Aboriginal Achievement Foundation (now Indspire) (1994)
 In August 2022 the Canadian Coast Guard Ship CCGS Jean Goodwill was commissioned. The ship is based in Dartmouth, Nova Scotia.

References

1928 births
1997 deaths
Canadian nurses
Canadian women nurses
Cree people
Canadian biographers
Officers of the Order of Canada
Women biographers
20th-century Canadian women writers
20th-century Canadian non-fiction writers
Indspire Awards
Canadian women non-fiction writers